A number of  elections on the local level are scheduled to take place in Mexico during 2008.

Local elections